Cymothoe oemilius, the striped glider, is a butterfly in the family Nymphalidae. It is found in Nigeria, Cameroon, Equatorial Guinea, Gabon, the Republic of the Congo, the Central African Republic and the Democratic Republic of the Congo. The habitat consists of forests.

Males are known to mud-puddle.

The larvae feed on Caloncoba species.

Subspecies
 Cymothoe ochreata oemilius (Nigeria: east and the Cross River loop, Cameroon, Gabon, Congo, Central African Republic, Democratic Republic of the Congo)
 Cymothoe ochreata fernandina Hall, 1929 (Bioko)

References

Butterflies described in 1859
Cymothoe (butterfly)